XHGSE-FM is a radio station on 98.1 FM in Guasave, Sinaloa. It is owned by RadioSistema del Noroeste and carries the Exa FM pop format from MVS Radio.

History
XHGSE-FM received its concession on June 29, 1990.

References

Radio stations in Sinaloa